Catherine Rousselet-Ceretti (born 17 May 1943) is a French fencer. She competed in the women's individual and team foil events at the 1964, 1968 and 1972 Summer Olympics.

References

External links
 

1943 births
Living people
French female foil fencers
Olympic fencers of France
Fencers at the 1964 Summer Olympics
Fencers at the 1968 Summer Olympics
Fencers at the 1972 Summer Olympics
Fencers from Paris